Enrique del Moral Dominguez (21 January 1905 – 11 June 1987) was a Mexican architect and an exponent of the functionalism movement, a modernist group that included Mexican artists and architects such as José Villagrán Garcia, Carlos Obregón Santacilia, Juan O'Gorman, Eugenio Peschard, Juan Legarreta, Carlos Tarditti, Enrique de la Mora and Enrique Yanez. The movement  developed from innovative concepts presented by Frank Lloyd Wright, Le Corbusier, Mies van der Rohe and the Bauhaus school as well as Die Stijl, and remodeled the profile of cosmopolitan Mexico City and other cities in the 1930s.

Over a span of more than fifty years, Enrique de Moral was designer and builder of over 100 public and private works in large metropolitan areas such as Mexico City as well as his hometown of Irapuato, but is primarily known for his role in the overall plan of the Ciudad Universitaria (1947–1952), site of the National Autonomous University of Mexico (UNAM), along with the architects Mario Pani and Salvador Ortega. He was responsible for the direction and coordination of the master project and the Rectorship Tower, one of the most representative features of the campus.

Del Moral modernized curricula during his time as director of the Faculty of Architecture (UNAM) (1944–1949), incorporating philosophies acquired from like-minded architects such as Mies van der Rohe at the Illinois Institute of Technology as well as Mexican philosophy on esthetic espoused by Dr. Jose Gaos in the Faculty of Philosophy and Literature (UNAM). He dedicated a large amount of his academic life to lecturing both domestically and abroad, and published books and essays on the evolution of architectural styles. He theorized about functionalism in Mexico and debated controversial issues of his time, such as the integration of plastic arts into architecture, and promoted the conservation of cities, approaching architecture in a way that could find balance between traditional and modern styles.

Biography

Early life 

Enrique del Moral Domínguez was born on 21 January 1905 in Irapuato, Guanajuato, the only son of Enrique del Moral and Maria de los Angeles Dominguez. Four years later, in 1909, the family moved to Mexico City, where Del Moral attended elementary, middle and high school at the Franco-English Institute. There, he met Juan O'Gorman, who went on to study architecture with Del Moral at the Academy of San Carlos.

During the upheaval of the Mexican Revolution, Enrique del Moral's mother Maria sought safety with her son in El Paso, Texas, where his mother had family. The trip to the United States gave him the lifelong nickname "El Gringo" as well as provided Del Moral with an outsider's view of the country. Enrique de Moral returned to Mexico to see a nation devastated by war and decades of poverty that was, at the same time, immensely rich in landscape, materials and culture.

Years of training 

At 18 years of age, Enrique del Moral met architect José Villagrán Garcia when he was a student and a colleague of Del Moral's cousin, Eduardo Jiménez del Moral, and soon afterward became interested in the architectural profession. In 1923 he entered the Faculty of Architecture (UNAM), which then had a staff of only 36 students and was housed in the old Academy of San Carlos.

In the year 1924, del Moral was invited to enter into a draftsmanship with Villagrán and Carlos Obregón Santacilia, the two most innovative architects in the country. With the latter, he participated in building projects for the Bank of Mexico (1925) and the Ministry of Health (1928), works with a clearly modern sensibility.

Del Moral became one of the first students of Villagrán invited to teach a free workshop on composition. Shortly after 1926, and under the guidance of his mentor, del Moral, like many architects of his generation, began the study of a new architectural theory:  functionalism. Functionalism emphasized the idea that every work comes from "a method that is determined by thoroughly analyzing and correctly interpreting a solution to guarantee success". These new values were extolled in the theories of "utility", "constructive sincerity, ""esthetics or harmony" and "social or moral value." All this meant a definitive break with the traditional architecture of academicism which was limited by its tendency to outright copy the French or Spanish colonial styles, with facades adorned with Greco-Roman, Neoclassical moulding.

On 29 November 1928 he was received as an architect. A few months later, after winning the lottery, Enrique del Moral undertook a trip to Europe for a full year in order to better understand the architectural expressions there, traveling to England, France, Spain, Italy, Switzerland, Germany, Czechoslovakia, the Netherlands and Belgium. Emulating Le Corbusier, who studied with pencil in hand the styles of the classics of European architecture, Del Moral created a series of drawings and watercolors of houses and buildings that possessed what he felt was an extraordinary quality.

Upon his return, he continued working in the studio of Obregón Santacilia, where he rose to building resident, then to foreman and then to partnership (1933–35). At this time he participated in projects such as the Monument to the Revolution, Reform Hotel and Hotel Prado with the architect Marcial Gutierrez Camarena, and the house of Manuel Gomez Morin (1930) with Juan O'Gorman.

First works and teaching 

During the thirties, Enrique del Moral started his first projects as an independent architect, as well as his teaching career at the Faculty of Architecture (UNAM). From 1934 on he taught the subjects of Draftsmanship and Composition (which was a beginning course until 1950).

In 1936 he set up his private office, associated with the architect Marcial Gutiérrez Camarena. His first project was to build ten houses for workers in his hometown of Irapuato, a project with a strong social context, drafted from surveys conducted with the workers and their families and adapted to the economic conditions of the inhabitants as well as the environment.

On 30 November 1940 Del Moral married Elisa Madrid Moreno.

After his marriage, Enrique del Moral completed many private projects; primarily residential houses and apartment buildings in zoned residential areas of Mexico City. However, there were contemporary public works projects that Del Moral collaborated on or oversaw; austere solutions that favored the use of local materials and avoiding waste. He was responsible for The General Hospital of San Luis Potosí (1943), and shortly afterward, began his period as Area Manager of the Administrative Committee of the Federal Program for School Construction (1944–46), during which time he built state schools such as the School of Casacuarán, Guanajuato (1946).

Maturation of style 
His spirit of curiosity about Mexican past and the present of the architecture developed in the country prompted him to enroll in the Seminar on the History of Ideas and Culture in the Eighteenth Century, taught by Dr. Jose Gaos in the Faculty of Philosophy and Literature of the Universidad Nacional Autonoma de Mexico (UNAM). From 1943 to 1946, the two men shared ideas and friendship with other intellectuals interested in discovering the essence of the Mexican culture in philosophy, science and art: Edmundo O'Gorman, Leopoldo Zea, Bernabe Navarro and Justin Fernandez, among others.

The experience paid off. In 1945 he wrote "The Baroque Stylistic Phenomenon", the first in a series of essays and articles that developed over four decades and which addressed a wide range of topics on history, theory, commitment, and modern architecture. Some of them are fundamental to understanding firsthand the avant-garde architectural movement in the Twentieth Century and their authors (Le Corbusier, Gropius, Frank Lloyd Wright, Mies van der Rohe, the Bauhaus, De Stijl), as well as the details of functionalism in Mexico.

In 1944 he was appointed director of the National School of Architecture, a position he held for five years. With the arrival of Dr. Salvador Zubirán to the rectorship of the UNAM (1946–48), he received approval to raise the academic level of the courses. In 1947 he traveled with the rector to the United States to visit various schools and talk to architects about educational systems. While at Harvard he met Walter Gropius, founder of the Bauhaus, and at the Illinois Institute of Technology, he formed a friendship with Mies van der Rohe (c. 1948), who provided ideas that served as the basis for a new curriculum.

As Career director, Del Moral was made the head of the greatest work of contemporary Mexican architecture: Ciudad Universitaria (1947–1954). It was a work that required enormous effort to coordinate.  For the first time in the country, more than 70 architects, interns, drafters, engineers and technicians were tasked with the construction of buildings, facilities and services. With Mario Pani, Del Moral developed the master plan based on the draft of the students Teodoro González de León, Enrique Molinar and Armando Franco. Del Moral and Pani were designated joint directors of the architectural project. Together they carried out for the building of the Torre de Rectoria (1950), with Salvador Ortega Flores, and the sports fields and entrances.

Del Moral's association with Pani began shortly before the contest for the project of building the Mexican Insurance (1946), later adapted for the Ministry of Water Resources, where their entries tied for first place. It was the first time they worked together and they continued to do so for seven years, a period in which a total of 22 works, most of them in Acapulco (the first airport, a fishing club and many hotels and houses), which had then begun its rise as a tourist center.

In 1948, Del Moral made perhaps his most emblematic example of functionalism with uniquely local features; Mexican, but at the same time, international: The family home in Tacubaya, Mexico City, next door to Luis Barragan.

Years of expertise 
From the fifties on, Del Moral encountered a stage of professional projects that demanded more rigorous technical knowledge, and more specialized knowledge with attention to social programs. One of them was the market of La Merced (1956), which supplanted thousands of makeshift and unsanitary stalls with spacious, well ventilated halls, an area to suit 550 stalls and 400 truck parking spaces, with amenities that included restrooms, an auditorium and eight child care centers.

The buildings of the Attorney General of the Federal District (1958) and Criminal Courts of Lecumberri, in association with the architect Hilario Galguera (1961) involved a solution with maximum efficiency for the movement of lawyers and inmates, as well as for the proper performance of legal work.

Del Moral deserves special mention for specialty and research hospitals built with funding and representation provided by the Ministry of Health in 1955. Del Moral designed and built in association with the architect Manuel Echávarri a total of thirteen hospitals (five more were planned); five for the Mexican Social Security Institute (IMSS) and the Institute of Security and Social Services for State Workers (ISSSTE), each in different states of the country: Federal District, Tabasco, Nuevo Leon, Tamaulipas, Sonora and Morelos. Of these the Gynecology Hospital (1969),  won him the prize for best work in Monterrey in design and production.

It is worth mentioning that during these years, Del Moral did not abandon teaching and trips to study abroad to see recent work or give lectures at conferences. From 1959 to 1963 he was professor of Mexican Architectural History at the Universidad Iberoamericana, and in the period from 1955 to 1978, he visited countries in Scandinavia, Eastern Europe, the Middle East and North Africa.

He died on 11 June 1987, at age 82 in Mexico City due to a stomach malady that was complicated by heart disease. His remains were cremated in the Civil Pantheon of Dolores.

Works and projects 

1936–1939
Houses for workers (Irapuato, Guanajuato). A
House and shop of Mr. Foyo (Irapuato, Guanajuato). A
Houses for employees (Irapuato, Guanajuato). A
House of Mr. Rodolfo E. Room Streets (Altai Mountain 529, Lomas de Chapultepec, Mexico City). A
Houses for rent 1938 Mr. Rodolfo E. Streets (Altai Mountain 519, Lomas de Chapultepec, Mexico City). A
Rebuilding the house of Mr. A. Palomino (Tabasco and Valladolid, Mexico City). A
Adaptation to house a bank branch (Las Cruces, Col. Centro, Mexico City). A
House of Juan Gallardo room Moreno (1113 Paseo de la Reforma, Mexico City). A
Apartment building for Mr. Gama (123 Abraham Gonzalez, Mexico City). A
André  Guieu House (Acapatzingo, Morelos).
Home for Girls (Reforma 414, Mexico City).

1940–1949

Apartment building for Mr. A. Palomino (88 Panuco River, Mexico City).
Apartment building for Mr. Gama (Zacatecas and Cordoba, Mexico City).
Apartment building for Gen. Plutarco Elias Calles (Melchor Ocampo 64, Mexico City).
Three houses for Mr. Garcia Moreno (Cuernavaca, Morelos).
Four houses for Gen. Plutarco Elias Calles (Sierra Nevada 315, Lomas de Chapultepec, Mexico City).
Building of apartments and offices for Mr. Gama (67 Independencia, Mexico City).
Seven homes Gen. Plutarco Elias Calles (Mount Altai 215, Lomas de Chapultepec, Mexico City).
Apartment building for Gen. Plutarco Elias Calles (Plaza Melchor Ocampo 56, Col. Cuauhtemoc, Mexico City).
House Room for Mr. Leon Avalos (240 F. Payo de Rivera, Mexico City).
Apartment building and home modification for Mr. C. Palomino (103 Panuco River, corner ** Tigris, Col. Cuauhtemoc, Mexico City).
House room Carlos Tejeda (Aida and Cedros, San Angel Inn, Mexico City). (Demolished)
General Hospital of San Luis Potosí (San Luis Potosí). B
House of Mr. V. Gama (Tlacopac, Mexico City).
Reconstruction and adaptation of two houses for Mr. Gama (41 Farias, Mexico City).
House of Jose and Luis Iturbe (Fracc. Mozimba, Acapulco, Guerrero).
Homestead of Mr. Villa Fregoso (334 Pyrenees, Mexico City).
Apartment building for Mr. M. Zumpano (75 Sinaloa, Mexico City).
Schools for the State of Guanajuato (Guanajuato).
House of Mr. Rodolfo E. Room Streets (Cajeme, Sonora).
Mr. Flavio household Borquez (Cajeme, Sonora).
Hotel apartments for Mr. J. and V. Range (39 Farias, Mexico City).
Nursery of the Buenos Aires (Mexico City).
House of Mr. Jose Iturbe (San Angel, Mexico City).
Rural primary school (Casacuarán, Guanajuato).
Mexican Insurance Building, later adapted for the Ministry of Water Resources (Paseo de la Reforma and Antonio Caso, Mexico City). C
Ciudad Universitaria: Plan Set (Pedregal de San Angel, Mexico City). C
Own House bedroom 1948 (Francisco Ramirez 5, Tacubaya, Mexico City).
Sports Fields training, building, bathrooms and dressing rooms for men at the Ciudad Universitaria campus (Pedregal de San Angel, Mexico City). c
Five single-family homes for architects (Costera Miguel German, numbers 36, 38, 40, 42 and 44, Acapulco, Guerrero). C

1950–1959

Rectorship Tower 1950 Ciudad Universitaria (Pedregal de San Angel, Mexico City). C, D
Ms. Coghlan House (City of Puebla, Puebla).
Offices and shops (5 May Avenue and Condesa, Mexico City).
Apartment building to Dr. P. S. Martinez (5 Hamburg, Mexico City).
House Sierra Room of Ms. Fernandez (Tennyson 117, Mexico City).
Mr. Flores Zavala House (Alejandro Dumas 265, Mexico City).
Bungalow for rent by Dr. Ray Manrique (Acapulco, Guerrero).
House of Miguel Arias (Acapulco, Guerrero).
Hotel "Pozo del Rey" for Mr. Marsalis (Acapulco, Guerrero). Demolished
Mr. Manuel Ibáñez House (Acapulco, Guerrero).
Hotel "Posada de los Siete Mares" for Mr. Zapata (Acapulco, Guerrero).
Hotel "Monte Mar Villas" (Acapulco, Guerrero).
Reinsurance Building Alliance (170 and Hamburg Insurgentes, Mexico City). F Demolished
Mr. Arturo Pani House (Mexico City).
Dressing the Club de Golf Mexico (Tlalpan, Mexico City). C
Bridge hotel "Fishing Club" for Mr. Guajardo (Acapulco, Guerrero).
Airport Acapulco (Guerrero). C
Home of Mrs. A. L. of Rabell (Acapulco, Guerrero).
Mr. Gallardo's household Moreno (1103 Reforma, Mexico City).
House for rent from Mr. Moreno Garcia (Caucasus and Appalachian Mountains, Mexico City).
Bullring 1953 (Acapulco, Guerrero).
House of Luis R. Montes (Acapulco, Guerrero).
House of Mr. Bernardo Quintana (Order 300, Pedregal de San Angel, Mexico City).
Mr. Dick House of Roziere (Toluca 11, Col. Flores Magon, Mexico City). G
Home of Mrs. Kaye (Pedregal de San Angel, Mexico City). D
Emergency Hospital (Medical Center, Mexico City). C
Children's Hospital (Villahermosa, Tabasco).
Central Laundry, Medical Center of IMSS (Mexico City). I
Laboratory Medicine (Medical Center, Mexico City).
Mercado de La Merced (Mexico City).
Building Chemical-Pharmaceutical Industry of Mexico (Athens and Versailles, Mexico City).
House of Mr. Hirsh (Monte Carlo 20, State of Mexico).
Building of the Attorney General of the Federal District (Av. Niños Héroes and Dr. Lavista, Mexico City). H

1960–1969

Secondary School (Postal Colony, Ciudad de Mexico). H
Criminal Courts of the Federal District Attorney (Builders, Mexico City).
Ten homes Iron Industry executives (Querétaro).
Iron Industry building (Querétaro).
Home of Mrs. T. Langenscheidt Fernandez (Tennyson 117, Col. Polanco, Mexico City). C
Monumental urban access 1962 the city of Querétaro for Grupo ICA (Querétaro).
Rehabilitation of a nineteenth century house for Mr. Clifford (Jonacatepec, Morelos).
Treasury Building for the Federal District (Av Ninos Heroes, Mexico City). I
Building department store parking lot for Sears (Mexico City).
School of Nursing at the Institute of Social Security and Services for State Workers **, ISSSTE (Mexico City). I
Medical Research Center of ISSSTE (Mexico City). I
ISSSTE Hospital and Clinic (Monterrey, Nuevo León). I
ISSSTE Hospital and Clinic (Tampico, Tamaulipas). I
General Hospital and Clinic of Instituto Mexicano del Seguro Social, IMSS (Ciudad Obregon, Sonora). I
Geriatric Hospital, Gildred Foundation (Lindavista, Mexico City). D
Clinical Hospital IMSS (Cuautla, Morelos). H
Metro stations with ICA Group (Calzada de Tlalpan, Mexico City). D
Prefabricated IMSS Clinic 1968 (Olympic Village, Mexico City). I
Physical Therapy Clinic of the IMSS (Olympic Village, Mexico City). I
Apartment building (323 Tonala, Mexico City). I
Gynecology 1969 IMSS Hospital (Monterrey, Nuevo León). I
Gallery and studio of Federico Sánchez Fogarty (Nepantla, State of Mexico).
Administrative offices and laundry IMSS (Monterrey, Nuevo León). I

1970–1979

State Delegation of IMSS 1970 (Monterrey, Nuevo León). I
IMSS Clinic Hospital 1972 (Monterrey, Nuevo León). I
IMSS Clinic Hospital Project (Nogales, Sonora). I
Project 1973 IMSS Psychiatric Hospital (Villa Coapa, Mexico City). I
Apartment building for Ms.. G. Ridolfi (Kentucky 16, Mexico City). I
Apartment building for Mr. Bernardo Quintana (Acapulco, Guerrero). I
Competition for Project-Constitution Square (México City).J
Building of the Central de Trabajadores de Mexico, CTM (Mexico City), where he served as project consultant.

a. Marcial Gutierrez partnered with Camarena.

b. In collaboration with Francisco Javier Cosio.

c. Associated with Mario Pani Darquier.

d. Associated with Salvador Ortega.

e. Associated with Jose Villagran.

f. in collaboration with Ignacio Medina Roiz.

g. In collaboration with Luis Ramos C.

h. In collaboration with Galguera Hilario Torres.

i. Echávarri In collaboration with Manuel Olvera.

j. Associated with Sjchetanan

Publications 

• Style. The Plastic Integration, 1966

• Protection and Conservation of Monumental Cities and Urban Complexes, 1977

• The Construction of the Ciudad Universitaria del Pedregal. Concept, Planning and Architectural Program, 1979 (co-authored with Mario Pani)

• The Man and Architecture. Trials and Testimonies, 1983

Honors 

Member of Mexican Culture Seminar (1957).
Member of the Advisory Council of Architecture, Universidad Iberoamericana (1955–1959).
Chairman of the Board of Architects honor of Mexico and the Mexican Society of Architects (1972–1974).
Member of the Governing Board of the UNAM (1967–1976).
Founder and member of the Academy of Arts and Fellow of the Bolivarian Society of Venezuela Architects (1968)
President of the Seminary of Mexican Culture (1968–1969).
Monterrey Award for best play, design and production of Gynecology IMSS Hospital (1972).
Secretary of the Academy of Arts (1972–1973).
National Prize for Arts and Sciences (Mexico) in Design and Technology, Government of Mexico (1978)
Great Academy Award, awarded by the Mexican Society of Architects (1982).
Honorary Doctor UNAM (1985).

Testimony 

Architect Pedro Ramirez Vazquez

 "Both as a student, and in practice, [Del Moral's] teaching always impregnated with deep concepts; technical rigor and critical judgments are always open, honest and generous. In the chair of composition at the School of Architecture, I had the opportunity to be a student directly, although each teacher had a limited number of learners and when Del Moral was quoted, I did not come on time to their group, but always attended as a listener to the correction process with my peers. All [of the] comments were a lesson in the respect and application of the theoretical principles of Del Moral and Villágran Garcia. They never had a direct line on the bill that was presented, never stated or suggested a specific solution, always questioned at the approach, the reason for a solution, and had comments and reflections; that is to say they taught to think without ever trying to impose solution criteria, which contrasted sharply with the position of other teachers about student work. They drew out a personal solution, thus making the student an artist of their own criteria.

Later, I had the opportunity to work in his private office, precisely at the stage that developed the Hospital of San Luis Potosi and the numerous private residences and apartment buildings, and lived closely by during the development working with my colleagues: Miguel Pavón Rivero served as Head of Workshop, Horacio Boy, Alfonso Garduño, Enrique Vergara, José Luis Certucha and more. I especially resolved administrative and technical aspects of the work with Mr. Elias Macotela Garcia, the engineer who was managing the office.l  During this period, I derived experiences that have been invaluable in my practice.

Throughout his lectures, his frequent articles, we have all come to appreciate the breadth of his acculturation and his interest in our roots." 

Architect Agustín Hernández Navarro

 "It was a great satisfaction to have frequently dealt with the architect Enrique del Moral, 'The Gringo' as he was called; then I came to having such confidence in our dealings also called him, 'My General', since he bore a certain resemblance to my general uncles also.

The conversations he had with Mario Pani, who always accompanied him, were most inspirational. They were two very different personalities, but had a great affinity for one another.

I remember being invited to parties often offered in their beautiful home, where they hosted very interesting personalities.

The last time I saw him, he was receiving care at the Nutrition Hospital and I suggested him to receive treatment in the United States, to which he replied that he would not for his love of our country.

There is an anecdote about him that I know directly from a cousin, also an architect, Alfonso Garduño Navarro, who worked in his studio. At the time of project, held a monologue as: 'I am window', 'am a wall,' etc., and he spoke with great concentration while doing some design, which surprised those around him. I remember that with great fondness and admiration." 

Architect Manuel Echavarri y Olvera

 "The architect Enrique del Moral is one of the great masters and visionaries of modern architecture in Mexico. Generally treated as 'El Maestro', and who taught in classrooms and workshops of the National School of Architecture, from 1934 to 1949 (only 15 years).

The Del Moral method of teaching was the workshop and the classroom, in his works, in traveling with him or at any meeting where he was with one or more architects and people interested in architecture and in every manifestation of art or culture in general ... The meetings at his home in Tacubaya made history.

I was proud to work with him for 25 years 'shoulder to shoulder' on the drawing board, as a draftsman, foreman, supervisor of work, collaborator and eventually, partner.

In the dedication of a book that submitted to me by the architect Hilario Galguera (another of his colleagues), I wrote: 'For those extraordinary days working in the workshop of the Gringo.'

And in another book from the master himself, Del Moral, which I keep with great affection, it reads: 'For the architect Manuel Echávarri, testifying to the long years of collaboration and with very sincere esteem and friendship: Architect Enrique del Moral .'"

Gallery

References

Bibliography 

Pinoncelly, Salvador. The work of Enrique del Moral. Mexico, National Autonomous University of Mexico, 1983.
Architecture and Society, Journal of the College of Architects of Mexico (CAM) and the Mexican Society of Architects (SAM), Issue dedicated to the "Grand Prize of the Academy: Enrique del Moral", Volume XXXVII, Issue 25, Mexico, 1983.
Enrique del Moral, Photography and work chosen, Mexico, UNAM, 1984.
Noelle, Louise. Enrique del Moral: an architect committed to Mexico. Mexico, National Council for Culture and the Arts, 1998.
Noelle, Louise. Enrique del Moral. Life and work. Mexico, UNAM, 2004

Functionalist architects
Modernist architects from Mexico
1905 births
1987 deaths
Artists from Guanajuato
People from Irapuato
National Autonomous University of Mexico alumni
20th-century Mexican architects